On Safari is a British children's television game show programme, produced by SMG Productions for broadcast on ITV network children's strand CITV in 2000.

The show was presented by Richard McCourt and featured two teams of two children taking part in a series of challenges and tasks within a safari park, including animal-care and physical skill challenges; the winning team took part in an endgame to win a prize (usually a trip to go on safari in Africa).

The show was re-broadcast on STV in 2009 as part of their weekend children's strand wknd@stv.

External links
On Safari on STV Player

2000s Scottish television series
2000 British television series debuts
2000 British television series endings
Scottish television shows
Television shows produced by Scottish Television